Eastwood Rugby is a rugby union club playing in the Sydney Premier Rugby competition.  The Eastwood District extends from the Parramatta River at Meadowbank to the Hawkesbury River at Wisemans Ferry. The Club currently plays at TG Millner Field. On 25 November 2020, the Club announced that it had secured approval for its new home ground at the Old Pony Club in Fred Caterson Reserve, Gilbert Rd Castle Hill

Honours 
Shute Shield Titles: 1999, 2002, 2003, 2011, 2014, 2015
 Australian Club Champions: (2) 2015, 2016

Club history 
Rugby has been played in the Northern Districts of Sydney since the latter part of the 19th century.  In the late 1890s a number of local sides existed playing at a variety of venues, the main one being Brush Farm.

With the outbreak of the Great War, senior rugby was suspended with many of the players enlisting, a number paying the supreme sacrifice.

Following W.W.1, the strength of Rugby in Eastwood and in Epping was centred around the respective Young Men's Institutes which fielded junior and senior sides in the Suburban Competition. At this time, Epping played at Epping Oval and Eastwood played at Eastwood Oval. Epping won the Kentwell Cup in 1926 and Eastwood won the Burke Cup in 1927.

Following further success in the 1930s, momentum was building to seek admission into the District Competition.  The outbreak of the Second World War caused a deferral of this plan until 1946 when a successful application was made for inclusion in the District Competition from the beginning of the 1947 Season.  This was following the amalgamation of the Eastwood and Epping Clubs.  As a result, the Eastwood District Rugby Union Football Club was formed and it has played in the Sydney District Competition ever since. Initially the new club's home ground was the Top Oval in Eastwood. In 1963, EDRUFC moved its home ground to TG Millner.

The Club has won a number of minor grade and Colts competitions over the years but did not win the 1st-grade major premiership trophy until 1999. In an historic win, the Club won the Shute Shield for the first time by defeating Sydney University in the Grand Final.

Since formation, the Club has produced numerous players who have played International rugby. Eastwood has a strong junior base which has won many NSW Junior Rugby Union State Championships.

Junior Clubs
 Northern Barbarians (formerly Beecroft-Cherrybrook)
 Central Eastwood (formerly Hillview and Epping Juniors)
 Dural Rugby 
 North Rocks Rugby 
 Redfield Rugby (Minis only)
 Ryde Rugby

Eastwood players who have at some time played  some level of International rugby

Current provincial representatives

Super Rugby
 Tim Anstee
 Lachie Anderson
Tane Edmed
Mark Nawaqanitawase
 Harry Wilson

References

External links
 Eastwood Rugby

Rugby union teams in Sydney
Rugby clubs established in 1947
1947 establishments in Australia
Eastwood, New South Wales